Yan Su (9 May 1930 – 12 February 2016) was a Chinese playwright and lyricist who served as vice-president of China Theatre Association. He held the civilian rank equivalent to general in the PLA Air Force Political Department Song and Dance Troupe. He was a National Class-A Screenwriter. He was a member of China Writers Association and China Music Copyright Association.

Biography
Yan Su was born Yan Zhiyang in Baoding, Hebei, on May 9, 1930. During the Second Sino-Japanese War, he, then 10 years old, moved to Chongqing with his family. He attended Chongqing Nankai Secondary School and graduated from Chongqing University, majoring in business administration.

He joined the Communist Youth League during the Chinese Civil War and joined the Communist Party of China in 1953. In 1950, he was transferred to Southwest Military Region Youth Song and Dance Troupe as an actor. He once performed in the front of Korean War. In 1955 he was transferred again to PLA Air Force Political Department Song and Dance Troupe.

He first rose to prominence in 1964 for playing in the opera Sister Jiang, earned critical acclaim, and he was personally interviewed by Chairman Mao Zedong. But two years later, in the Cultural Revolution, the song was labeled as "poisonous weed" and he was cast as a rightist.

In 1982, Journey to the West was broadcast on CCTV, the series reached number one in the ratings when it aired in China. The opening theme, Dare to Ask Where is the Road, was written by Yan Su. In 1986 he joined the China Writers Association.

In 2015, he was elected "moved China" Person of the Year 2015. On October 27, 2015, a military vocalist Yu Wenhua made up a rumor on Sinaweibo - "Teacher Yan Su died of illness at PLA Air Force General Hospital in Beijing". Later, Yan's wife Li Wenhui said in an interview that her husband is alive and they will investigate the legal responsibility of the rumormonger. "My father has been into a deep coma after acute cerebral infarction for more than twenty days, at present, his situation is stable, it's fair to say that he had the potential to wake up, but risk is often with opportunities, thank you for asking." Yan Yu, son of Yan Su, said in response to questions from journalists. On February 12, 2016, Yan Su died at the General Hospital of the People's Liberation Army Air Force, in Beijing. At the time of his death, he was set to judge a CCTV talent show and art advisor of the CCTV New Year's Gala.

On January 7, 2018, unable to reach an agreement on the proportion of the income distribution of Yan Su's music copyright, Yan's wife and daughter sued his son to the court for property analysis of the music copyright enjoyed by the heir, ordering his wife to enjoy two-thirds and his daughter to enjoy one-sixth.

Personal life
Yan Su began dating Li Wenhui in 1959, they married in 1961, the couple have a son, Yan Yu, and two grandsons.

Works

Important works in lyrics
 Dare to Ask Where is the Road
 Song Face Painting of Beijing Opera
 Beijing Is the Hometown
 Folk Song Beijing Life Style Life Used to Be
 Smoke and Mirrors
 My Love to the Blue Sky of Motherland
 Going To Sichuan
 Oriental Pearl Tower
 Great Wall Great
 I Am the Sky
 Guilin is My Home
 Face Changing
 Everything Goes Well
 Mission
 Celebrating the New Year in the Army

Opera
 Sister Jiang
 Daughter of the Party
 Special District Rondo
 Memories of Mother
 Three Chrysanthemum of Jiaodong
 Fourth Sister Liu

Beijing opera
 Red Rock
 The Red Detachment of Women
 May There Be Surplus Year After Year
 Armed Working Team Behind Enemy Lines
 Red Light

Awards

References

1930 births
2016 deaths
Writers from Baoding
Chongqing Nankai Secondary School alumni
Chongqing University alumni
Musicians from Baoding
Mandopop musicians
Chinese lyricists
Chinese dramatists and playwrights
People of the Republic of China
Educators from Hebei
Burials at Babaoshan Revolutionary Cemetery